European youth bests in the sport of athletics are the all-time best marks set in competition by European athletes aged 17 or younger throughout the entire calendar year of the performance. European Athletics (EA) doesn't maintain an official list for such performances. All bests shown on this list are tracked by statisticians not officially sanctioned by the governing body.

Outdoor
h = hand timing

OT = oversized track (> 200m in circumference)

Boys

Girls

Indoor

Boys

Girls

References

Youth
European